Talkhab-e Ahmadi (also Romanized as Talkhāb-e Aḩmadī) is a village in Howmeh-ye Gharbi Rural District, in the Central District of Izeh County, Khuzestan Province, Iran. At the 2006 census, its population was 110, in 22 families.

References 

Populated places in Izeh County